Robert Joseph Scahill (born February 15, 1987) is an American former professional baseball pitcher. He previously played for the Pittsburgh Pirates, Colorado Rockies, Milwaukee Brewers, and Chicago White Sox.

Career

Colorado Rockies
Scahill attended Willowbrook High School in Villa Park, Illinois, and Bradley University, where he played college baseball for the Bradley Braves. The New York Yankees selected Scahill in the 48th round of the 2008 Major League Baseball Draft, but he did not sign, and returned to Bradley for his senior year. He was then drafted by the Colorado Rockies in the ninth round of the 2009 Major League Baseball Draft.

Scahill was called up to the majors for the first time on September 5, 2012.

Pittsburgh Pirates
He was traded to the Pittsburgh Pirates for Shane Carle on November 11, 2014.

Milwaukee Brewers
On July 12, 2016, he was claimed off waivers by the Milwaukee Brewers and optioned to the Colorado Springs Sky Sox of the Class AAA Pacific Coast League. Scahill was designated for assignment by the Brewers on January 31, 2017. On May 1, 2017, the Brewers purchased Scahill's contract from Colorado Springs.

Chicago White Sox
On December 1, 2017, Scahill signed a minor league contract with the Chicago White Sox. He began the season with the AAA Charlotte Knights, and was promoted to the major leagues on September 8, 2018.

Chicago Cubs
On January 18, 2019, Scahill signed a minor league deal with the Chicago Cubs. He was released on March 9, 2019.

References

External links

Bradley Braves bio

1987 births
Living people
People from Winfield, Illinois
Baseball players from Illinois
Major League Baseball pitchers
Colorado Rockies players
Pittsburgh Pirates players
Milwaukee Brewers players
Chicago White Sox players
Bradley Braves baseball players
Tri-City Dust Devils players
Modesto Nuts players
Tulsa Drillers players
Colorado Springs Sky Sox players
Salt River Rafters players
Indianapolis Indians players
Charlotte Knights players